The Four is a 2012 Hong Kong wuxia film directed by Gordon Chan and Janet Chun. It is the first film adaptation of Woon Swee Oan's novel series Si Da Ming Bu (四大名捕; The Four Great Constables), which has previously been adapted to a television series. In all adaptations and interpretations, the nicknames of the Four remained the same — Emotionless, Iron Hands, Life Snatcher and Cold Blood. They dedicated their special skills to the service of their chief, Master Zhuge, in solving crimes and apprehending powerful criminals.

The film is the first in a trilogy, the second installment of which started shooting in 2012. The Four II was released on 6 December 2013. The last film, The Four III, was released on 22 August 2014.

Plot
The movie is set during the reign of Emperor Huizong in the late Northern Song Dynasty. The government department known as the "Department Six" customarily has full jurisdiction over all criminal investigations in the imperial capital. Department Six is well-staffed and operates in a highly disciplined manner. Their chief, Commandant Liu, ranks the investigators by clearance rate and dangles the prospect of an operator to be named one of the "Great Four".

The story begins with the country experiencing a significant increase in circulation of counterfeit coin currency, leading to growing unrest and instability. Official investigators from the Department Six, acting on a tip-off, rush in full force to apprehend a suspect who is trying to sell a coin die stolen from the imperial mint, only to find the suspect and the evidence being taken into custody by agents of a hitherto unknown secret service, known as the Divine Constabulary, which is commissioned by the Emperor himself.

This arouses jealousy in Commandant Liu, who openly fires Cold Blood, one of his best men. Liu secretly orders Cold Blood to infiltrate the Divine Constabulary to find a way to bring down the rival agency. Liu is unaware that his own establishment has been infiltrated by double-agents dispatched by the mastermind behind the counterfeit currency.

Despite being aware of Cold Blood's true mission, the chief of the Divine Constabulary seeks out Cold Blood and welcomes him into the agency. Once inside, Cold Blood is surprised to observe that the Divine Constabulary staff live and work together more like a family than a highly formalised professional security force. Despite their small size, the Constabulary works efficiently and effectively through a few individuals with very specialised skills which are useful in solving crimes. Cold Blood finds his loyalties divided, and things are made harder as he becomes tangled in a love triangle with two girls, one from each agency.

Cast
 Deng Chao as Lengxue (Cold Blood)
 Liu Yifei as Wuqing (Emotionless)
 Ronald Cheng as Zhuiming (Life Snatcher)
 Collin Chou as Tieshou (Iron Fist)
 Anthony Wong as Zhuge Zhengwo
 Jiang Yiyan as Ji Yaohua
 Wu Xiubo as An Shigeng (God of Money)
 Gui Gui as Dingdang
 Cheng Taishen as Bushen (Sheriff King or also Lord Liu)
 Sheren Tang as Jiaoniang (Aunt Poise)
 Ryu Kohata as Cen Chong (Rockslider)
 Michael Tong as Han Long
 Tin Kai-Man as Jia San
 Waise Lee as Prince
 Bao Bei'er as Dalang (Big Dog)
 Tang Zhiping as Butou (Thunderclap)
 Zhang Songwen as Qian Jian (Treasury Minister)
 Fang Anna as Hudie (Butterfly)
 Miao Chi as Dayong (Guts/Berserker)
 Xiang Tianran as Ling'er (Belle)
 Liu Changde as Xu Feng

Production
The Four features characters from a continuing series of wuxia novels by Malaysian Chinese writer Woon Swee Oan. The novels have been adapted for some television series in Hong Kong, Taiwan and China, including ATV's The Undercover Agents and TVB's The Four. Gordon Chan had started shooting the film by April 2011.

Release
The Four was released in China and Hong Kong on 12 July 2012. In Hong Kong, the film premiered at 5th place at the weekend box office grossing HK$125,607. The film grossed a total of $252,829 in Hong Kong.

Reception
Film Business Asia gave the film a five out of ten rating, stating that The Four "isn't exactly boring — thanks to the crowded plot and cast — but just very average, with no real tension, drama or thrills."

Notes

External links
 
 

Hong Kong superhero films
Wuxia films
Kung fu films
Films directed by Gordon Chan
Adaptations of works by Woon Swee Oan
Films set in 12th-century Song dynasty
Films based on Chinese novels
Chinese martial arts films
2012 martial arts films
2012 films
2010s Hong Kong films